Mount Howard is a  mountain summit located in the Coast Mountains of British Columbia, Canada. It is part of the Joffre Group, which is a subset of the Lillooet Ranges. Precipitation runoff from the peak drains into Twin One Creek thence Lillooet Lake which is within the Lillooet River watershed.

Etymology

The mountain was named after John Howard, (1944–1978), an avid mountaineer and founder of a guide service that opened up the Joffre Group area for other climbers. He was killed in a climbing accident near the Columbia Icefield when he fell into a crevasse near the top of the Athabasca Glacier on February 23, 1978. The mountain's toponym was officially adopted June 11, 1979, by the Geographical Names Board of Canada.

Climate

Based on the Köppen climate classification, Mount Howard is located in a subarctic climate zone of western North America. Most weather fronts originate in the Pacific Ocean, and travel east toward the Coast Mountains where they are forced upward by the range (Orographic lift), causing them to drop their moisture in the form of rain or snowfall. As a result, the Coast Mountains experience high precipitation, especially during the winter months in the form of snowfall. Winter temperatures can drop below −20 °C with wind chill factors below −30 °C. This climate supports the Twin One Glacier on the peak's north slope. The months July through September offer the most favorable weather for climbing Mount Howard.

See also

 Geography of British Columbia
 Geology of British Columbia

Gallery

References

External links
 Weather: Mount Howard
 Mt. Howard (photo): Flickr

Pacific Ranges
Two-thousanders of British Columbia
Coast Mountains
Lillooet Land District